Gowell Sylvester Claset (1907–1981) was an American Major League Baseball pitcher. He played for the Philadelphia Athletics during the  season.

References

Major League Baseball pitchers
Philadelphia Athletics players
Baseball players from Michigan
Sportspeople from Battle Creek, Michigan
1907 births
1981 deaths